Neuenkirchen (official German disambiguation: Neuenkirchen (Land Hadeln); N. Low Saxon: Neenkarken) is a municipality in the Land Hadeln collective municipality within the district of Cuxhaven, in Lower Saxony, Germany.

History
Neuenkirchen belonged to the Land of Hadeln, first an exclave of the younger Duchy of Saxony and after its de facto dynastic partition in 1296 of the Duchy of Saxe-Lauenburg, established de jure in 1260. In 1728 Emperor Charles VI enfeoffed the George II Augustus and his House of Hanover in personal union with the reverted fief of Saxe-Lauenburg. By a redeployment of Hanoverian territories in 1731 the Hanoverian Duchies of Bremen and Verden were conveyed the administration of the neighboured Land of Hadeln. The Kingdom of Hanover incorporated the Land of Hadeln in a real union and its territory, including Neuenkirchen, became part of the new Stade Region, established in 1823.

Toponym etymology
Neuenkirchen, meaning New Church in German, was named accordingly following the completion of a new Lutheran St. Mary's Church in 1732.

Notable people 
 Hinrich Wilhelm Kopf (1893-1961), German politician

References